The FIS Nordic Junior and U23 World Ski Championships 2016 took place in Râșnov, Romania from 22 February to 28 February 2016. It was the 39th Junior World Championships and the 11th Under-23 World Championships in nordic skiing.

Due to weather conditions, the 5 km and 10 km classic interval start cross-country skiing events were moved one day forward. 10 km and 20 km skiathlon were replaced by 10 and 15 km freestyle mass start. Both relays were moved forward by two days.

Nordic combined 10 km/normal hill was moved one day forward, while 5 km/normal hill was moved three days earlier than scheduled.

Individual ski jumping events were arranged two days earlier than scheduled, the mixed team event two days earlier, and the men's team event three days ahead of schedule.

Medal summary

Junior events

Cross-country skiing

Nordic Combined

Ski jumping

Under-23 events

Cross-country skiing

Medal table

References

External links
 Official program

2016
2016 in cross-country skiing
2016 in ski jumping
Junior World Ski Championships
2016 in youth sport
International sports competitions hosted by Romania
February 2016 sports events in Romania